Live in Boston is a live performance video/music album by British-American rock band Fleetwood Mac, released on 15 June 2004. The concert was filmed on 23–24 September 2003 at the FleetCenter (now known as the TD Garden) in Boston, Massachusetts during the group's Say You Will Tour. The concert is a double DVD set, and also comes with a sampler CD, containing the audio of ten songs from the show. Part of WTTW's Soundstage series which also chronicled Buckingham and Nicks solo in 2005 and 2008 respectively.

DVD track listing

DVD 1
"The Chain" (Lindsey Buckingham, Mick Fleetwood, Christine McVie, John McVie, Stevie Nicks)
"Dreams" (Nicks)
"Eyes of the World" (Buckingham)
"Peacekeeper" (Buckingham)
"Second Hand News" (Buckingham)
"Say You Will" (Nicks)
"Never Going Back Again" (Buckingham)
"Rhiannon" (Nicks)
"Come" (Buckingham)
"Gypsy" (Nicks)
"Big Love" (Buckingham)
"Landslide" (Nicks)

DVD 2
"Say Goodbye" (Buckingham)
"What's the World Coming To" (Buckingham)
"Beautiful Child" (Nicks)
"Gold Dust Woman" (Nicks)
"I'm So Afraid" (Buckingham)
"Silver Springs" (Nicks)
"Tusk" (Buckingham)
"Stand Back" (Nicks)
"Go Your Own Way" (Buckingham)
"World Turning" (C. McVie, Buckingham)++
"Don't Stop" (C. McVie)
"Goodbye Baby" (Nicks)

++ Does not appear in the Soundstage episode that aired on PBS.

CD track listing
The following songs are included on a CD that comes with the double DVD set.

"Eyes of the World" – 3:28
"Dreams" – 4:28
"Rhiannon" – 5:17
"Come" – 8:24
"Big Love" – 3:01
"Landslide" – 4:15
"Silver Springs" – 5:25
"I'm So Afraid" – 9:39
"Stand Back" – 6:44
"Go Your Own Way" – 7:16

Selections from Live in Boston
The following tracks are available for download from most download services.

Vol. 1
"The Chain"
"Say You Will"
"Never Going Back Again"
"Don't Stop"

Vol. 2
"Gypsy"
"Second Hand News"
"Peacekeeper"
"Goodbye Baby"

Personnel
Fleetwood Mac:
 Stevie Nicks – vocals; tambourine
 Lindsey Buckingham – lead guitar, vocals
 John McVie – bass guitar
 Mick Fleetwood – drums, percussion, vocals on "World Turning"

Additional Personnel:
 Jana Anderson – background vocals
 Sharon Celani – background vocals
 Neale Heywood – guitar, background vocals
 Taku Hirano – percussion
 Steve Rinkov – additional drums
 Carlos Rios – guitar
 Brett Tuggle – keyboards, guitar, background vocals

Production
Photography by Neal Preston and Karen Johnston

Music mixed by Ed Cherney and Mark Needham

Live Recording by David Hewitt on Remote Recording Services Silver Truck

References

2004 video albums
Fleetwood Mac live albums
Live video albums
2004 live albums